Stephen Paul Hatton (born 28 January 1948) is an Australian politician, who was Chief Minister of the Northern Territory of Australia from 1986 to 1988. From 1983 until his retirement in 2001, he was MLA for the seat of Nightcliff. He first became a minister in December 1984 in the Ian Tuxworth government.

|}

He played an important role in the referendum for statehood for the Northern Territory in 1998. He had served for many years on a bipartisan committee of the Northern Territory Legislative Assembly, which had recommended a constitution and an elected Constitutional Assembly to give it further consideration. The then Chief Minister, Shane Stone put forward a different constitution to a non-elected Constitutional Assembly. Steve Hatton was prominent in opposing this kind of statehood. The referendum failed, and he was reported as saying "One of the campaign slogans at the time was: 'we want statehood, not Stonehood'".

References

1948 births
Living people
Chief Ministers of the Northern Territory
Attorneys-General of the Northern Territory
Members of the Northern Territory Legislative Assembly
Country Liberal Party members of the Northern Territory Legislative Assembly
University of New South Wales alumni
Recipients of the Centenary Medal
21st-century Australian politicians